Venel is a surname. Notable people with the surname include:

Gabriel François Venel (1723–1775), French chemist and physician
Jean-Jacques Challet-Venel (1811–1893), Swiss politician
Paul Venel (1864–1920), French army officer and colonial governor
Teddy Venel (born 1985), French sprinter